Avon Publications is one of the leading publishers of romance fiction. At Avon's initial stages, it was an American paperback book and comic book publisher. The shift in content occurred in the early 1970s with multiple Avon romance titles reaching and maintaining spots in bestseller lists, demonstrating the market and potential profits in romance publication. As of 2010, Avon is an imprint of HarperCollins.

Early history (1941–1971)

Avon Books was founded in 1941 by the American News Company (ANC) to create a rival to Pocket Books.  They hired brother and sister Joseph Meyers and Edna Meyers Williams to establish the company.  ANC bought out J.S. Ogilvie Publications, a dime novel publisher partly owned by both the Meyers, and renamed it "Avon Publications".  They also got into comic books. "The early Avons were somewhat similar in appearance to the existing paperbacks of Pocket Books, resulting in an immediate and largely ineffective lawsuit by that company.  Despite this superficial similarity, though, from early on Meyers differentiated Avon by placing an emphasis on popular appeal rather than loftier concepts of literary merit." The first 40 titles were not numbered.  First editions of the first dozen or so have front and rear endpapers with an illustration of a globe.  The emphasis on "popular appeal" led Avon to publish ghost stories, sexually-suggestive love stories, fantasy novels and science fiction in its early years, which were far removed in audience appeal from the somewhat more literary Pocket Books competition.

As well as normal-sized paperbacks, Avon published digest-format paperbacks (the size and shape of the present-day Ellery Queen's Mystery Magazine) in series.  These included Murder Mystery Monthly, Modern Short Story Monthly and Avon Fantasy Reader.  Many authors highly prized by present-day collectors were published in these editions, including A. Merritt, James M. Cain, H. P. Lovecraft, Raymond Chandler and Robert E. Howard.

In 1953, Avon Books sold books in the price range of 25¢ to 50¢ (for the Avon "G" series, the "G" standing for "Giant") and were selling more than 20 million copies a year. Their books were characterized by Time magazine as "westerns, whodunits and the kind of boy-meets-girl story that can be illustrated by a ripe cheesecake jacket".  At around this time, Avon also began to publish under other imprints, including Eton (1951–1953), Novel Library, Broadway and Diversey.  Avon's 35¢ "T" series, introduced in 1953, also had strong mass-market appeal and contains many outstanding examples of the then-popular juvenile delinquent story.  The "T" series also contained many movie tie-in editions and the stand-bys of mysteries and science fiction.

Avon was bought by the Hearst Corporation in 1959.

In the late 1960s there was a surge of interest in Satanism largely due to the emergence of Anton LaVey's Church of Satan in 1966 and the success of Ira Levin's novel Rosemary's Baby in 1967. In 1968, an Avon editor named Peter Mayer approached Anton LaVey with the idea of publishing a "Satanic Bible", and he asked Anton to author it. Anton obliged, and in December 1969 The Satanic Bible was published as an Avon paperback.

History of Avon Romance (post-1972)

In 1972, Avon entered the modern romance genre with the publication of Kathleen Woodiwiss' The Flame and the Flower. The novel went on to sell 2.35 million copies. Avon followed its release with the 1974 publication of Woodiwiss's second novel, The Wolf and the Dove. The next two romances by newcomer Rosemary Rogers, Sweet Savage Love and Dark Fires, also published in 1974, reached bestseller status. The latter sold two million copies in its first three months of release and the former inspired the name of the genre: "sweet savage romances".

In 1999, the News Corporation bought out Hearst's book division. Avon's hardcover and non-romance paperback lines were moved to sister company Morrow, leaving Avon as solely a romance publisher.

Avon launched the erotica imprint Avon Red in 2006. Avon developed the event KissCon in 2014, in order to serve the population of romance readers looking for more interaction with their authors and opportunities to strengthen their reading community connections.

For its 75-year anniversary in 2016, Avon published 65 original titles, along with an anniversary edition of Shanna, a romance novel by Kathleen E. Woodiwiss, published in 1977 that held a spot on the New York Times Best Seller list for over thirty weeks. In addition to the re-release, the book included a foreword by the more recent bestseller, and another author represented by Avon, Lisa Kleypas.

Avon Comics

From at least 1945 through the mid-1950s, Avon published comic books.  Its titles included horror fiction, science fiction, Westerns, romance comics, war comics and talking animal comics. Most titles lasted only a few issues, with the six longest-running detailed in the complete list below:

All True Detective
Atomic Spy Cases
Attack On Planet Mars
Avon Fantasy - An Earth Man On Venus
Bachelor's Diary
Badmen of the West
Badmen of Tombstone
Behind Prison Bars
Betty and Her Steady
The Blackhawk Indian Tomahawk War
Blazing Six Guns
Boy Detective
Buddies in the U.S. Army
Butch Cassidy
Campus Romance
Captain Silver's Log of the Sea Hound
Captain Steve Savage (1950 and 1954 series)
Chief Crazy Horse
Chief Victorio's Apache Massacre
City of the Living Dead
Complete Romance
Cow Puncher
Custer's Last Fight
The Dalton Boys
Davy Crockett
Diary of Horror
Eerie
Escape from Devil's Island
Famous Gangsters
Fighting Daniel Boone
Fighting Davy Crockett
Fighting Indians of the Wild West! (plus 1952 annual)
Fighting Undersea Commandos
Flying Saucers (1950 and 1952 series)
For a Night of Love
Frontier Romances
Funnies Annual
Funny Tunes
Gangsters and Gun Molls
Geronimo
Going Steady with Betty
Jesse James (24 issues plus 1952 annual, 1950–56; no issues #10–14 published)
King of the Bad Men of Deadwood
King Solomon's Mines
Kit Carson
Last of The Comanches
Little Jack Frost
The Mask of Dr. Fu Manchu
The Masked Bandit
Merry Mouse
Molly O'Day
Murderous Gangsters
Night of Mystery
Out of This World
Out of This World Adventures
Outlaws of the Wild West
Pancho Villa
Parole Breakers
Penny
Peter Rabbit Comics (#1–6, 1947–1949) and Peter Rabbit (#7–34, 1950–56)
Peter Rabbit Easter Parade (one-shot)
Peter Rabbit Jumbo Book (one-shot)
Phantom Witch Doctor
Pixie Puzzle Rocket To Adventureland (one-shot)
Police Line-Up
Prison Break!
Prison Riot
Realistic Romances
Red Mountain featuring Quantrell's Raiders
Robotmen of the Lost Planet
Rocket to the Moon
Romantic Love (1949 and 1954 series)
The Saint (12 issues, 1947–1952)
The Savage Raids of Chief Geronimo
Sea Hound
Secret Diary of Eerie Adventures
Sensational Police Cases
Sheriff Bob Dixon's Chuck Wagon
Sideshow
Slave Girl Comics
Space Comics
Space Detective
Space Mouse
Space Thrillers
Sparkling Love
Spotty the Pup
Strange Worlds (22 issues, 1950–1952, 1954–1955)
Super Pup
Teddy Roosevelt and His Rough Riders
Television Puppet Show
U.S. Marines in Action
U.S. Paratroops
U.S. Tank Commandos
Undersea Fighting Commandos
The Underworld Story'''The Unknown ManWar Dogs of the U.S. ArmyWestern BanditsWhite Chief of the Pawnee IndiansWhite Princess of the Jungle Wild Bill Hickok (28 issues, 1949–1956)WitchcraftWith the U.S. Paratroops Behind Enemy Lines''

References

External links

Book publishing companies based in New York (state)
Comic book publishing companies of the United States

Publishing companies based in New York City
Publishing companies established in 1941
1941 establishments in New York City
Defunct comics and manga publishing companies
Avon Comics
News Corporation subsidiaries